Kavanaj (also Romanized as Kavānaj and Kavānej; also known as Govānech, Kavāneh, and Kawāna) is a village in Pirsalman Rural District, in the Central District of Asadabad County, Hamadan Province, Iran. At the 2006 census, its population was 231, in 59 families.

References 

Populated places in Asadabad County